The following is a list of notable deaths in September 2019.

Entries for each day are listed alphabetically by surname. A typical entry lists information in the following sequence:
 Name, age, country of citizenship at birth, subsequent country of citizenship (if applicable), reason for notability, cause of death (if known), and reference.

September 2019

1
George Abe, 82, Japanese manga artist (Rainbow: Nisha Rokubō no Shichinin), pneumonia.
Kenneth Baugh, 78, Jamaican politician, MP and Leader of the Opposition (2005).
Alison Cheek, 92, Australian-born American Episcopal priest.
Charles W. Daniels, 76, American judge, justice of the New Mexico Supreme Court (2007–2018).
Jacob Gelt Dekker, 71, Dutch businessman, writer and philanthropist, lymphoma.
Radomil Eliška, 88, Czech conductor.
Albert Fritz, 72, German racing cyclist.
Alberto Goldman, 81, Brazilian politician, MP (1979–2006), Minister of Transport (1992–1993) and Governor of São Paulo (2010–2011), cancer.
Adiss Harmandian, 74, Lebanese-Armenian pop singer, cancer.
Gagik Hovunts, 89, Armenian composer.
Astrid Hanzalek, 91, American politician, member of the Connecticut House of Representatives (1971–1981).
Kari Lehtola, 80, Finnish lawyer, head of the Safety Investigation Authority (1996–2001).
Katherine MacLean, 94, American science fiction author.
Ciaran McKeown, 76, Northern Irish peace activist.
Archbishop Nikon of Boston, 73, American Eastern Orthodox prelate, Archbishop of the Albanian Archdiocese (since 2003) and New England (since 2005).
Barbara Probst Solomon, 90, American author.
Joana Sainz García, 30, Spanish dancer and choreographer, injuries sustained in pyrotechnic explosion.
Jean Edward Smith, 86, American biographer.
Jukka Virtanen, 86, Finnish director, actor and screenwriter (Levyraati, Pähkähullu Suomi, Noin seitsemän veljestä), cancer.

2
Michael Beddow, 72, British academic.
Rémi Bouchard, 83, Canadian composer and educator.
Rea Brändle, 66, Swiss journalist.
Jack Clay, 92, American acting teacher, cancer.
William G. Daughtridge Jr., 86, American politician.
Atli Eðvaldsson, 62, Icelandic football player (Borussia Dortmund, Fortuna Düsseldorf, national team) and manager, cancer.
Carlo Fonseka, 86, Sri Lankan physician, President of the Medical Council (2012–2017).
Dorothea Benton Frank, 67, American author, myelodysplastic syndrome.
Jose Garcia Cosme, 62, Puerto Rican convicted drug dealer, shot.
Andrea Gemma, 88, Italian Roman Catholic prelate, Bishop of Isernia-Venafro (1990–2006).
Gordie Haworth, 87, Canadian ice hockey player (New York Rangers).
Sergei Kirpichenko, 68, Russian diplomat, Ambassador to Egypt (since 2011).
Gyoji Matsumoto, 85, Japanese footballer (national team), heart disease.
Kevin Percy, 84, New Zealand Olympic hockey player (1960).
Rainer Pethran, 68, German Olympic basketball player (1972).
Frederic Pryor, 86, American economist.
Helmut Rauch, 80, Austrian nuclear physicist.
Joan Antoni Solans Huguet, 77, Spanish urban planner, traffic collision.
Jean Storms, 93, Belgian racing cyclist.
Mieczysław Tracz, 56, Polish Olympic wrestler (1988).

3
Athanase Bala, 92, Cameroonian Roman Catholic prelate, Bishop of Bafia (1977–2003).
Henry Crapo, 87, American mathematician.
LaShawn Daniels, 41, American songwriter ("Say My Name", "Love and War"), Grammy winner (2000), traffic collision.
Diet Eman, 99, Dutch Resistance fighter and writer.
David Evans, 94, Australian politician, MLA (1968–1989).
Wendell Foster, 95, American politician, member of the New York City Council (1978–2001).
Halvard Hanevold, 49, Norwegian biathlete, Olympic champion (1998, 2002, 2010).
George Klopfer, 79, American physician.
Peter Lindbergh, 74, German fashion photographer (Stern, Vogue, Rolling Stone) and film director.
Carol Lynley, 77, American actress (Harlow, Bunny Lake Is Missing, The Poseidon Adventure), heart attack.
José de Jesús Pimiento Rodríguez, 100, Colombian Roman Catholic cardinal, Archbishop of Manizales (1975–1996), heart attack.
Rita Steblin, 68, Canadian musicologist.
Tony Thiessen, 77, Australian footballer (Melbourne, Carlton, North Melbourne).

4
Edgardo Andrada, 80, Argentine footballer (Rosario Central, Vasco, national team).
James Atlas, 70, American publisher (Penguin Books), complications from a lung condition.
Sir Hugh Beach, 96, British general, Master-General of the Ordnance (1977–1981).
Pál Berendy, 86, Hungarian footballer (Vasas SC, national team).
Gerardo Bujanda Sarasola, 100, Spanish Civil War veteran and Basque nationalist politician, Deputy (1977–1982).
Kottakkal Chandrasekharan, 74, Indian Kathakali dancer.
Dai Tielang, 88, Chinese animator (Black Cat Detective, A Deer of Nine Colors, Where is Mama).
Patrick Dehornoy, 66, French mathematician, discoverer of Dehornoy order.
Peter Ellis, 61, New Zealand convicted child sex abuser and injustice claimant, bladder cancer.
Roger Etchegaray, 96, French Roman Catholic cardinal, Auxiliary Bishop of Paris (1969–1970), Archbishop of Marseille (1970–1985) and President of PCCU (1984–1995).
Kylie Rae Harris, 30, American country singer, traffic collision.
Jamie Janson, 43, British aid worker and militant, suicide.
Tevfik Kış, 85, Turkish wrestler, Olympic champion (1960).
Stuart B. Levy, 80, American microbiologist.
Kenny Mitchell, 62, English footballer (Newcastle United).
Abdullah Morsi, 25, Egyptian presidential son.
Desmond Morton, 81, Canadian historian.
Felipe Ruvalcaba, 78, Mexican footballer (1964 Olympics, CD Oro, national team).
Timothy Seow, 81, Singaporean architect, pancreatic cancer.
Konstantin Simun, 85, Russian sculptor.
S. Sriram, Indian film producer (Thiruda Thiruda, Bombay, Aasai), cardiac arrest.
Tsem Tulku Rinpoche, 53, Taiwanese-born Malaysian Tibetan tulku, liver failure.
Dan Warner, 49, American Grammy-award winning musician (Julio Iglesias, Alejandro Sanz, Calle 13), heart attack.

5
Abid Ali, 67, Pakistani actor (Waris, Seerat) and director (Dasht), liver failure.
Charlie Cole, 64, American photojournalist, World Press Photo of the Year winner (1989), sepsis.
Rod Coneybeare, 89, Canadian puppeteer and voice actor (The Friendly Giant).
Waldron Fox-Decent, 83, Canadian political scientist.
Ji Guobiao, 87, Chinese chemical engineer, member of the Chinese Academy of Engineering, laryngeal cancer.
Alberto Jara Franzoy, 90, Chilean Roman Catholic prelate, Bishop of Chillán (1982–2006).
Jimmy Johnson, 76, American musician (Muscle Shoals Rhythm Section) and record producer.
Akitsugu Konno, 75, Japanese ski jumper, Olympic silver medallist (1972).
Liu Xu, 80, Chinese pharmaceutical chemist, discovered artesunate.
Chris March, 56, American fashion designer (Beach Blanket Babylon), heart attack.
Kiran Nagarkar, 77, Indian novelist (Cuckold), cerebral hemorrhage.
Denis Nsanzamahoro, Rwandan actor (100 Days, Sometimes in April) and film director, complications from diabetes.
Tom Phoebus, 77, American baseball player (Baltimore Orioles).
Andrzej Polkowski, 80, Polish translator.
Parvez Rob, 56, Bangladeshi music director and composer, traffic collision.
Bob Rule, 75, American basketball player (Seattle SuperSonics, Philadelphia 76ers, Cleveland Cavaliers).
Francisco Toledo, 79, Mexican expressionist artist.
Jaroslav Weigel, 88, Czech actor (Empties, Waiter, Scarper!) and comics artist (Lips Tullian).
Wally Westlake, 98, American baseball player (Pittsburgh Pirates, St. Louis Cardinals, Cleveland Indians).

6
Chng Seok Tin, 73, Singaporean multi-media artist, lung cancer.
Bob Church, 82, Canadian geneticist.
Chris Duncan, 38, American baseball player (St. Louis Cardinals), World Series champion (2006), glioblastoma.
Chandrasiri Gajadeera, 73, Sri Lankan politician, MP (1994–2001, since 2004).
Susan Irvine, 91, Australian educator, author and rose authority.
Sukhdev Singh Libra, 86, Indian politician, MP (1998–2014).
Leonard W. Moore, 85, American chief executive.
José Moreno, 61, Dominican baseball player (New York Mets, San Diego Padres), pulmonary failure.
Robert Mugabe, 95, Zimbabwean revolutionary and politician, President (1987–2017) and Prime Minister (1980–1987), cancer.
Abdul Qadir, 63, Pakistani cricketer (national team), heart attack.
Chester Williams, 49, South African rugby union player (Western Province, national team) and coach (Blitzboks), heart attack.

7
Robert Axelrod, 70, American actor (Mighty Morphin Power Rangers, The Blob, Digimon).
Roger Boutry, 87, French composer and conductor, music director of the Republican Guard (1973–1977).
Al Carmichael, 90, American football player (Green Bay Packers, Denver Broncos) and stuntman (Spartacus).
Alberto Cerreti, 80, Italian politician, President of the Province of Grosseto (1985–1990).
Naiyyum Choudhury, 72, Bangladeshi biochemist.
Alfredo Córdoba, 94, Mexican Olympic footballer (1948).
Lawrie Creamer, 81, New Zealand protein chemist (Fonterra).
Terry Horne, 65, New Zealand cricketer (Central Districts).
Veeru Krishnan, Indian film actor (Akele Hum Akele Tum, Raja Hindustani, Ishq).
Volodymyr Luciv, 90, Ukrainian bandurist and tenor.
Mongsen Ching Monsin, 58, Bangladeshi journalist, researcher and writer.
Peter Nichols, 92, British playwright (A Day in the Death of Joe Egg, Passion Play, Poppy).
James Robertson, 81, American judge, United States District Court for the District of Columbia (1994–2008), cardiovascular disease.
Charlie Silvera, 94, American baseball player (New York Yankees).
Guy Travaglio, 93, American politician, member of the Pennsylvania House of Representatives (1995–2004).
Peter van Dijk, 90, American architect (Blossom Music Center, Anthony J. Celebrezze Federal Building).
John Wesley, 72, American actor (Stop! Or My Mom Will Shoot, Superhuman Samurai Syber-Squad, Hang 'Em High), multiple myeloma.
Wu Minsheng, 73, Chinese mechanical engineer and academic, President of Fuzhou University (2002–2010).

8
Tufail Abbas, 91, Pakistani trade unionist.
Shlomo Bar-Shavit, 90, Israeli actor and theatre director, pneumonia.
Marjorie Blamey, 101, British illustrator.
Marca Bristo, 66, American disability rights activist, cancer.
Henri de Contenson, 93, French archaeologist.
Sir Christopher Dobson, 69, British chemist, Master of St John's College, Cambridge (since 2007), pancreatic cancer.
Timur Eneev, 94, Russian mathematician.
David Hagberg, 76, American novelist.
Jerry Haldi, 84, Israeli football player (Hapoel Petah Tikva, national team) and manager (Hakoah Sydney).
Adelaine Hain, 82, South African anti-apartheid activist.
Roger Hsieh, 85, Taiwanese politician, member of the Legislative Yuan (1993–1999).
Ram Jethmalani, 95, Indian lawyer and politician, MP (1977–1984, since 2010) and Minister of Law and Justice (1996, 1999–2000).
Susan Kamil, 69, American journalist, editor-in-chief of Random House (since 2008), lung cancer.
Ibrahima Kébé, 64, Senegalese painter, complications from diabetes.
Yisrael Kessar, 88, Israeli politician, member of the Knesset (1984–1995).
Joseph P. Kolter, 93, American politician, member of the House of Representatives (1983–1993).
Lito Legaspi, 77, Filipino actor (Sinong Kapiling? Sinong Kasiping?, Pugoy Hostage: Davao, The Good Daughter), cardiac arrest.
Paul Lyons, 50, Australian Olympic taekwondo practitioner (1992, 2000).
Jane Mead, 61, American poet, cancer.
Yusuf Motala, 72, Indian Islamic scholar, heart attack.
Christopher James, 5th Baron Northbourne, 93, British aristocrat, member of the House of Lords (1982–2018).
S. Rajasekar, 62, Indian actor (Saravanan Meenatchi) and director.
Marina Schiano, 77, Italian fashion model and journalist, complications from kidney cancer surgery.
Camilo Sesto, 72, Spanish singer-songwriter ("Algo Más", "Amor Mío, ¿Qué Me Has Hecho?"), heart failure.
Olav Skjevesland, 77, Norwegian Lutheran prelate, Bishop of Agder og Telemark (1998–2012).
Carlos Squeo, 71, Argentine footballer (Racing Club, Boca Juniors, national team).

9
Jim Archer, 87, American baseball player (Kansas City Athletics).
Neiron Ball, 27, American football player (Oakland Raiders), arteriovenous malformation.
Brian Barnes, 74, Scottish golfer, cancer.
Robert Frank, 94, Swiss-American photographer (The Americans) and documentary filmmaker (Cocksucker Blues).
Danny Frawley, 56, Australian football player (St Kilda, Victoria) and coach (Richmond), traffic collision.
Dulce García, 54, Cuban Olympic javelin thrower (1992), heart attack.
Jim Greengrass, 91, American baseball player (Cincinnati Reds/Redlegs, Philadelphia Phillies).
Lissy Gröner, 65, German politician, MEP (1989–2009).
Gru, 46, Serbian rapper ("Da li imaš pravo?", "Biću tu", "I dalje me žele"), paragliding accident.
Fred Herzog, 88, Canadian photographer.
Joe Keough, 73, American baseball player (Oakland Athletics, Kansas City Royals, Chicago White Sox).
Sahar Khodayari, 29, Iranian football fan and activist, self-immolation.
Kim Seong-hwan, 86, South Korean cartoonist.
Lavrentis Machairitsas, 62, Greek rock musician, heart attack.
Fred McLeod, 67, American sportscaster (Cleveland Cavaliers, Detroit Pistons).
Jarzinho Pieter, 31, Curaçaoan footballer (Centro Dominguito, national team), heart attack.
Michael Shenstone, 91, Canadian diplomat.
Alister Taylor, 75, New Zealand publisher.
Derek Varnals, 84, South African cricketer (Eastern Province, Natal, national team).
Gordon Willden, 89, Canadian politician.
Jarrid Wilson, 30, American pastor and writer, suicide.

10
Ahsan Ali, 82, Bangladeshi physician.
David McCurdy Baird, 99, Canadian geologist, photographer and academic.
Hal Gibson Pateshall Colebatch, 73, Australian author. 
Betty Corwin, 98, American theatre archivist, founder of Theatre on Film and Tape Archive.
Sam Davis, 75, American football player (Pittsburgh Steelers).
Stefano Delle Chiaie, 82, Italian neofascist activist, founder of the National Vanguard.
Yuval Elizur, 92, Israeli economic journalist.
Jeff Fenholt, 68, American musician (Bible Black, Geezer Butler Band), actor (Jesus Christ Superstar) and television evangelist.
Ariel Hollinshead, 90, American pharmacologist.
Nodar Khaduri, 49, Georgian politician, Minister of Finance (2012–2016), heart disease.
Li Ping, 95, Chinese geologist and earthquake engineer, member of the Chinese Academy of Engineering.
Branislav Lončar, 81, Serbian Olympic sport shooter (1960, 1968).
Salvatore Mannuzzu, 89, Italian writer and politician, Deputy (1976–1987), heart attack.
Robert N. McClelland, 89, American surgeon (operated on President John Fitzgerald Kennedy and Lee Harvey Oswald), renal failure.
Valerie Van Ost, 75, English actress (Carry On, The Beauty Jungle, Mister Ten Per Cent), liver cancer.
Hossam Ramzy, 65, Egyptian percussionist and composer.
Albert Razin, 79, Russian language activist, self-immolation.
Jai Krishan Sharma, 76, Indian politician, President of Himachal Pradesh Bharatiya Janata Party (2000–2003), MLA (1998–2003).
Billy Stacy, 83, American football player (Chicago Cardinals/St. Louis Cardinals) and politician, mayor of Starkville, Mississippi (1985–1989).
Greg Thompson, 72, Canadian politician, MP (1988–1993, 1997–2011), Minister of Veterans Affairs (2006–2010), cancer.
Süleyman Turan, 82, Turkish actor (Ayşecik ve Sihirli Cüceler Rüyalar Ülkesinde, Güllü, The Ark of the Sun God), heart attack.
Lydia Zeitlhofer, 88, German Olympic gymnast (1952).

11
Carlos Bazán Zender, 81, Peruvian physician and politician, Minister of Health (1985).
Len Clark, 103, English civil servant and countryside campaigner.
B. J. Habibie, 83, Indonesian politician, President (1998–1999), Vice President (1998) and Minister of Research and Technology (1978–1998), heart failure.
Daniel Johnston, 58, American singer-songwriter ("Walking the Cow") and visual artist, heart attack.
Annette Kolodny, 78, American feminist literary critic, infections as a complication from rheumatoid arthritis.
Mardik Martin, 84, Iranian-born Iraqi-American screenwriter (Raging Bull, Mean Streets, New York, New York).
T. Boone Pickens, 91, American businessman and philanthropist.
Maria Postoico, 69, Moldovan politician.
László Rajk Jr., 70, Hungarian architect (Aquincum Museum), art director (The Martian) and politician, MP (1990–1996).
Terrell Roberts, 38, American football player (Cincinnati Bengals), shot.
Shafie Salleh, 72, Malaysian politician, MP (1999–2008), Minister of Higher Education (2004–2006).
Joe Scudero, 88, American football player (Washington Redskins, Pittsburgh Steelers, Toronto Argonauts), cancer.
Anne Rivers Siddons, 83, American novelist (Peachtree Road, The House Next Door), lung cancer.
James B. Stoltman, 84, American archaeologist.
Zbigniew Szymczak, 67, Polish chess player.
Sándor Tóth, 80, Hungarian poet, journalist and politician, MP (1990–1994).
Penny Whetton, 61, Australian climatologist.

12
Juanita Abernathy, 87, American civil rights activist (Montgomery bus boycott), complications from a stroke.
Ruth Abrams, 88, American judge.
Linda Baboolal, 78, Trinidadian politician, President of the Senate (2002–2007).
Bou Thang, 81, Cambodian politician, Senator (2012–2016) and Deputy Prime Minister (1986–1992, since 2016).
Sir Norman Browse, 87, British surgeon, President of the States of Alderney (2002–2011).
Sir Hugh Cunningham, 97, British military officer, Deputy Chief of the Defence Staff (1976–1978).
Wade Doak, 79, New Zealand marine conservationist.
Bill Egerton, 75, British politician, Lord Mayor of Manchester (1992–1993).
Michael E. Haynes, 92, American minister and politician, member of the Massachusetts House of Representatives (1965–1969).
The Hun, 81, American cartoonist.
Ida Laila, 75, Indonesian singer.
I. Beverly Lake Jr., 85, American jurist, Chief Justice of the North Carolina Supreme Court (2001–2006).
Levon Manaseryan, 94, Armenian painter.
László Marton, 76, Hungarian theatre director.
ʻAkilisi Pōhiva, 78, Tongan politician and activist, Prime Minister (since 2014), pneumonia.
Keith Robbins, 79, British historian and vice-chancellor of University of Wales, Lampeter (1992–2003).
Francis Xavier Roque, 90, American Roman Catholic prelate, Auxiliary Bishop of Military Archdiocese (1983–2004).
Bill Schelly, 67, American writer, multiple myeloma.
Dennis Schmitz, 82, American poet.
Ed Stankiewicz, 89, Canadian ice hockey player (Detroit Red Wings).
Martin Trust, 84, American businessman and philanthropist.

13
Thomas A. Aldrich, 95, American USAF major general. 
Asadollah Asgaroladi, 85, Iranian businessman, stroke.
James Bacque, 90, Canadian writer.
Magdalen Berns, 36, Scottish YouTuber, glioblastoma.
Cynthia Cockburn, 85, British feminist and peace activist.
Paul Cronin, 81, Australian actor (The Sullivans, Matlock Police, State Coroner).
Leon Crouch, 70, English businessman, cancer.
Dennis Edwards, 82, English footballer (Charlton Athletic).
Rene Espina, 89, Filipino politician, Senator (1970–1973) and Governor of Cebu (1963–1968).
Mary Anne Frey, 84, American aerospace physician.
Larry Garron, 82, American football player (Boston Patriots).
Alex Grammas, 93, American baseball player (St. Louis Cardinals) and coach (Cincinnati Reds, Detroit Tigers).
Bruno Grandi, 85, Italian sports executive, President of the International Gymnastics Federation (1996–2016).
Rudi Gutendorf, 93, German football manager (FC Luzern, Schalke 04, China national team).
Charles Henderson, 96, Australian Olympic weightlifter (1956).
Bavelile Hlongwa, 38, South African politician, MP (since 2019), traffic collision.
Ghulam Shah Jeelani, 62, Pakistani politician, member of the Provincial Assembly of Sindh (since 2008), kidney failure.
Frank Key, 60, British writer.
György Konrád, 86, Hungarian novelist and political dissident, President of PEN International (1990–1993).
Joachim Messing, 73, German-American microbiologist.
Eddie Money, 70, American singer ("Take Me Home Tonight") and songwriter ("Two Tickets to Paradise", "Baby Hold On"), complications from heart surgery.
Nana Yaa Nyamaa II, 64, Ghanaian royal, queen of Sunyani (since 1972).
Noel O'Donovan, 69, Irish actor (Rawhead Rex, The Field, Far and Away).
Nanos Valaoritis, 98, Greek writer.
Joseph Peter Wilson, 84, American Olympic cross-country skier (1960).
Steven Zucker, 70, American mathematician.

14
Else Ackermann, 85, German politician.
Gene Bacque, 82, American baseball player (Hanshin Tigers, Kintetsu Buffaloes), complications from abdominal aneurysm surgery.
Paul Bannai, 99, American politician.
Jean Heywood, 98, British actress (When the Boat Comes In, Our Day Out, Billy Elliot).
Edmund Jones, 101, American politician, member of the Pennsylvania House of Representatives (1971–1974).
Claudia Ochoa Félix, 32, Mexican model, pulmonary aspiration from drug overdose.
Julian Piper, 72, English blues guitarist.
John Ralston, 92, American Hall of Fame football coach (Utah State, Stanford, Denver Broncos).
William Bradford Reynolds, 77, American attorney.
Kathleen M. Richardson, 91, Canadian businesswoman and philanthropist, President of the Royal Winnipeg Ballet (1957–1961).
Sam Szafran, 84, French artist.
Roberto Villetti, 75, Italian politician.
Tom Waddell, 60, Scottish-American baseball player (Cleveland Indians).
Wu Yigong, 80, Chinese film director (My Memories of Old Beijing, Evening Rain, The Tribulations of a Chinese Gentleman).

15
Fausto Alvarado, 69, Peruvian politician and historian, Congressman (1990–1992, 2001–2006) and Minister of Justice (2002–2004).
Leah Bracknell, 55, British actress (Emmerdale, Casualty 1900s, The Royal Today), lung cancer.
Lol Mahamat Choua, 80, Chadian politician, President (1979).
Sir Michael Edwardes, 88, British-South African businessman, Chairman of British Leyland (1977–1982) and International Computers Limited (1984).
Chadlia Fahrat Essebsi, 83, Tunisian consort, First Lady (2014–2019).
Heikki Häiväoja, 90, Finnish sculptor and coin designer.
Eva Haldimann, 92, Swiss literary critic and translator.
David Hurst, 93, German-British actor (Kelly's Heroes, The Boys from Brazil, Hello, Dolly!).
André Jourdain, 84, French politician.
Roberto Leal, 67, Portuguese-Brazilian singer, skin cancer.
Tonny Maringgi, 60, Indonesian Olympic table tennis player (1988).
Phyllis Newman, 86, American actress (Subways Are for Sleeping, Mannequin, To Find a Man) and singer.
Arthur Nims, 96, American federal judge.
Keith Foote Nyborg, 89, American diplomat. Ambassador to Finland (1981–1986).
Ric Ocasek, 75, American Hall of Fame musician (The Cars), singer-songwriter ("My Best Friend's Girl", "You Might Think") and record producer, cardiovascular disease.
Johann Pollak, 70, Austrian Olympic judoka (1972, 1976).
Andrés Sardá Sacristán, 90, Spanish fashion designer (Andrés Sardá).
Montserrat Soliva Torrentó, 76, Spanish chemistry doctor, specialist in composting.
Mike Stefanik, 61, American racing driver, seven-time NASCAR Whelen Modified Tour champion, plane crash.
Marcelo Trujillo, 84, Puerto Rican politician, mayor of Humacao (since 2001), cardiac arrest.
Mark von Hagen, 65, American military historian.
Azellia White, 106, American aviator.

16
Anthony R. Bucco, 81, American politician, member of the New Jersey General Assembly (1995–1998) and Senate (since 1998), heart attack.
Henry Buttelmann, 90, American fighter pilot.
Sir Toby Clarke, 80, British businessman.
John Cohen, 87, American folk musician (New Lost City Ramblers) and musicologist.
Luigi Colani, 91, German industrial designer.
Steve Dalachinsky, 72, American poet, stroke.
Peter Stormonth Darling, 86, British investment banker. 
H. S. Dillon, 74, Indonesian agricultural expert, political economist and human rights activist.
Olga Duque de Ospina, 89, Colombian politician and diplomat, Minister of Education (1996–1997), Senator (1978–1982, 1986–1990) and Governor of Huila (1974–1975).
Sir Donald Gosling, 90, British vice admiral and businessman, Chairman of National Car Parks (1959–1998).
Paul Ingrassia, 69, American journalist, Managing Editor of Reuters (2011–2016), Pulitzer Prize winner (1993), cancer.
Davo Karničar, 56, Slovenian mountaineer, hit by falling tree.
B. J. Khatal-Patil, 100, Indian politician, MLA (1962–1985).
Ira A. Lipman, 78, American businessman, founder of Guardsmark, cancer.
Peter Lucas, 89, Australian footballer (Collingwood).
Ascención Mendieta, 93, Spanish anti-White Terror activist.
Eric Woodfin Naylor, 82, American Hispanist.
Manuel Delgado Parker, 82, Peruvian businessman, founder of Grupo RPP.
Bobby Prentice, 65, Scottish footballer (Heart of Midlothian, Toronto Blizzard).
Kodela Siva Prasada Rao, 72, Indian politician, MLA (since 1983), suicide by hanging.
Sakahoko Nobushige, 58, Japanese sumo wrestler and coach (Izutsu stable), pancreatic cancer.
Sander Vanocur, 91, American political journalist, complications from dementia.
Kees Vermunt, 88, Dutch footballer.
Vic Vogel, 84, Canadian jazz pianist, composer and conductor.

17
Fabio Buzzi, 76, Italian motorboat racer, founder of FB Design, motorboat crash.
Carlos Cisneros, 71, American politician, member of the New Mexico Senate (since 1985), heart attack.
Dominique Damiani, 66, French Olympic racing cyclist (1984).
Khem Singh Gill, 89, Indian geneticist and plant breeder, Vice-Chancellor of the Punjab Agricultural University (1990–1993).
Jessica Jaymes, 40, American Hall of Fame pornographic actress, seizure.
Harold Mabern, 83, American jazz pianist and composer, heart attack.
Robert Oatey, 77, Australian footballer (Norwood, Sturt).
Cokie Roberts, 75, American journalist (ABC News, NPR), political commentator and author, complications from breast cancer.
Fred T. Sai, 95, Ghanaian family health physician.
Sathaar, 67, Indian actor (Ottayan, God for Sale), liver disease.
Dina Ugorskaja, 46, Russian-born German pianist, cancer.
Suzanne Whang, 56, American actress (Las Vegas, From Here on OUT) and television host (House Hunters), breast cancer.
Roy Williamson, 86, British Anglican cleric, Bishop of Southwark (1991–1998).
Harvey Wylie, 86, Canadian football player (Calgary Stampeders).
Ye Xuanping, 94, Chinese politician, Mayor of Guangzhou (1980–1985) and Governor of Guangdong (1985–1991).

18
Julius H. Baggett, 94, American politician and judge.
Lady Anne Berry, 99, English-New Zealand horticulturist, founder of Rosemoor Garden.
Alexandru Darie, 60, Romanian theater director.
Chuck Dauphin, 45, American sports radio broadcaster and country music journalist, complications from diabetes.
Ibrahim El-Orabi, 88, Egyptian military officer, Chief of Staff of Armed Forces (1983–1987).
Graeme Gibson, 85, Canadian novelist.
Imata Kabua, 76, Marshallese politician, President (1997–2000).
Constantine Lyngdoh, 63, Indian politician.
Kelvin Maynard, 32, Surinamese-born Dutch footballer (Burton Albion, FC Volendam, FC Emmen), shot.
Tony Mills, 57, English rock singer (Shy, TNT), pancreatic cancer.
H. R. Mithrapala, 73, Sri Lankan politician, MP (2004–2015) and Minister of Consumer Affairs (2007–2010).
Shyam Ramsay, 67, Indian film director (Darwaza, Veerana) and screenwriter (Zee Horror Show), pneumonia.
Fernando Ricksen, 43, Dutch footballer (Fortuna Sittard, Rangers, national team), motor neurone disease.
Masako Seki, 77, Japanese table tennis player.
Richard Watson, 88, American philosopher and speleologist.
Dolly Zegerius, 94, Indonesian athlete.
Zhang Zhenxin, 48, Chinese financial entrepreneur, multiple organ failure.

19
Zine El Abidine Ben Ali, 83, Tunisian military officer and politician, Prime Minister (1987) and President (1987–2011), prostate cancer.
Irina Bogacheva, 80, Russian mezzo-soprano.
Luigi Bommarito, 93, Italian Roman Catholic prelate, Bishop of Agrigento (1976–1980) and Archbishop of Catania (1988–2002).
Wim Crouwel, 90, Dutch graphic and type designer (New Alphabet).
Marco Feingold, 106, Austrian Holocaust survivor.
Maurice Ferré, 84, American politician, Mayor of Miami (1973–1985) and member of the Florida House of Representatives (1967–1968), spinal cancer.
Charles Gérard, 96, French actor (The Toy,  Animal, A Man and a Woman: 20 Years Later).
Bert Hellinger, 93, German psychotherapist (Family Constellations).
Barron Hilton, 91, American businessman, Chairman of Hilton Hotels Corporation (1966–2007), co-founder of the AFL and owner of the Los Angeles Chargers (1960–1966).
Sam Hinds, 66, American baseball player (Milwaukee Brewers).
Virginia Isbell, 87, American educator and politician.
Sandie Jones, 68, Irish singer ("Ceol an Ghrá").
Peter J. McQuillan, 90, American judge. 
S. K. Padmadevi, 95, Indian actress (Bhakta Dhruva,  Samsara Nauka, Gangavathar).
Koča Pavlović, 57, Montenegrin journalist and politician, MP (since 2006).
Peppers Pride, 16, American racehorse, euthanized.
María Rivas, 59, Venezuelan Latin jazz singer, composer and painter, cancer.
Levente Riz, 44, Hungarian politician, MP (2010–2014).
Yonrico Scott, 63, American drummer (The Derek Trucks Band).
Ibrahim Sesay, Sierra Leonean politician, MP.
Sol Stein, 92, American publisher (Stein and Day), complications from dementia.
Larry Wallis, 70, English musician (Pink Fairies, Motörhead).
John Winston, 91, English actor (Star Trek).
Henry Woods, 95, British army major general.

20
Nikken Abe, 96, Japanese Buddhist monk, High Priest of Nichiren Shōshū (1978–2005).
Abraham Octavianus Atururi, 68, Indonesian military officer and politician, Governor of West Papua Province (2006–2017).
Rick Bognar, 49, Canadian wrestler (WWF, NJPW, FMW), heart attack.
Robert Boyd, 91, American journalist (Knight Ridder) and bureau chief, Pulitzer Prize winner (1973), heart failure.
Wayne Brown, 88, Canadian ice hockey player (Boston Bruins, Seattle Bombers, Tacoma Rockets).
Myles Burnyeat, 80, British philosopher and scholar.
Howard Cassady, 85, American Hall of Fame football player (Ohio State, Detroit Lions, Cleveland Browns), Heisman Trophy winner (1955).
Séamus Hegarty, 79, Irish Roman Catholic prelate, Bishop of Raphoe (1982–1994) and Derry (1994–2011).
Diarmuid Lawrence, 71, British television director.
Jim Macken, 92, Australian judge.
Gregorio Martínez Sacristán, 72, Spanish Roman Catholic prelate, Bishop of Zamora (since 2007).
Jan Merlin, 94, American actor (Gunfight at Comanche Creek, Take the Money and Run, The Twilight People).
Eric Samuelsen, 63, American playwright.
Su Beng, 100, Taiwanese dissident, political activist and historian (Modern History of Taiwanese in 400 Years), Senior advisor (since 2016), multiple organ failure.
Tsang Hin-chi, 85, Hong Kong entrepreneur and politician, member of the Standing Committee of the National People's Congress (1994–2008).
Frans Van Looy, 69, Belgian Olympic racing cyclist (1972), suicide.
Cheryl White, 65, American jockey.

21
Gerhard Auer, 76, German rower, Olympic champion (1972).
Tommy Brooker, 79, American football player (Alabama, Dallas Texans/Kansas City Chiefs).
Napoleon Chagnon, 81, American anthropologist.
Mel Chionglo, 73, Filipino film director (Sibak: Midnight Dancers, Burlesk King, Twilight Dancers).
David Combe, 76, Australian lobbyist (Combe-Ivanov affair).
Jean-Claude Coucardon, 69, French Olympic rower (1972, 1976).
Jack Donner, 90, American actor (As the World Turns, Four Christmases, All About Evil).
Aron Eisenberg, 50, American actor (Star Trek: Deep Space Nine, The Horror Show, Prayer of the Rollerboys), heart failure.
Sid Haig, 80, American actor (The Devil's Rejects, Jason of Star Command, THX 1138), complications from a lung infection.
E. J. Holub, 81, American Hall of Fame football player (Dallas Texans/Kansas City Chiefs).
Sigmund Jähn, 82, German cosmonaut (Soyuz 31, Soyuz 29).
Günter Kunert, 90, German writer.
George Lardner, 85, American journalist (The Washington Post), Pulitzer Prize winner (1993), complications from strokes.
Karin Larsson, 78, Swedish Olympic swimmer (1956, 1960).
Gerard Mannion, 48, Irish theologian and ecumenist.
Mohamed Farid Md Rafik, 43, Malaysian politician, MP (since 2018), heart attack.
Jarred Rome, 42, American Olympic discus thrower (2004, 2012), fentanyl overdose.
Christopher Rouse, 70, American composer, Grammy (2002) and Pulitzer Prize winner (1993), complications from kidney cancer.
Carl Ruiz, 44, American chef and television personality, heart attack.
Naramalli Sivaprasad, 68, Indian actor (Khaidi, Aatadista) and politician, MP (2009–2019), kidney failure.
Jevan Snead, 32, American football player (Tampa Bay Buccaneers, Tampa Bay Storm).
Boriss Teterevs, 65, Latvian businessman and film producer (Machete Kills, Sin City: A Dame to Kill For).
Shuping Wang, 59, Chinese-American medical researcher and public health whistleblower.
Woo Hye-mi, 31, South Korean singer (The Voice of Korea).
Aleko Yordan, 83, Turkish footballer (Beykoz, AEK, national team).

22
Vytautas Briedis, 79, Lithuanian rower, Olympic bronze medallist (1968).
Rosemarie Burian, 83, American humanitarian, founder of the Northern Illinois Food Bank.
Wally Chambers, 68, American football player (Chicago Bears, Tampa Bay Buccaneers).
Courtney Cox Cole, 48, American basketball player (Indiana Hoosiers), lung cancer.
Chartwell Dutiro, 62, Zimbabwean musician.
Harry Joseph Flynn, 86, American Roman Catholic prelate, Archbishop of Saint Paul and Minneapolis (1995–2008), cancer.
Nat Frazier, 84, American college basketball coach (Morgan State), complications from heart disease.
Ahmad Said Hamdan, 67, Malaysian civil servant, Chief Commissioner of the Malaysian Anti-Corruption Commission (2007–2009), complications from a stroke.
Masroor Jahan, 81, Indian Urdu author.
Ivan Kizimov, 91, Russian equestrian, Olympic champion (1968, 1972).
Jack Meda, 73, Canadian boxer, heart attack.
J. Michael Mendel, 54, American television producer (The Simpsons, Rick and Morty, The Critic), Emmy winner (1995, 1997, 1998, 2018).
Nguyễn Văn Bảy, 83, Vietnamese jet fighter pilot.
Miguel Patiño Velázquez, 80, Mexican Roman Catholic prelate, Bishop of Apatzingán (1981–2014).
Lee Paul, 80, American actor (The Sting, Hawaii Five-O, Ben).
Tom Polanic, 76, Canadian ice hockey player (Minnesota North Stars).
Sándor Sára, 85, Hungarian cinematographer (Ten Thousand Days, Szindbád) and film director (The Upthrown Stone).

23
Al Alvarez, 90, English poet (The New Poetry) and writer (The Biggest Game in Town), pneumonia.
Madhav Apte, 86, Indian cricket player (national team) and administrator, President of the Cricket Club of India (since 1989), cardiac arrest.
Huguette Caland, 88, Lebanese painter.
Andre Emmett, 37, American basketball player (Texas Tech, Memphis Grizzlies), shot.
Fan Kang, 95, Chinese economic historian.
Elaine Feinstein, 88, English poet.
Robert Hunter, 78, American Hall of Fame lyricist (Grateful Dead, Jerry Garcia, Bob Dylan), poet and musician.
Harri Hurme, 74, Finnish chess player.
William Green Miller, 88, American diplomat, second United States ambassador to Ukraine.
Walter Nicoletti, 66, Italian football manager (Empoli, Pisa, Livorno).
Joan Petersilia, 68, American criminologist, ovarian cancer.
Artūras Rimkevičius, 36, Lithuanian footballer (FBK Kaunas, FK Liepājas Metalurgs, Šiauliai), suicide by gunshot.
Tauto Sansbury, 70, Australian social justice advocate, non-Hodgkin lymphoma.
Arifin Siregar, 85, Indonesian bureaucrat, Minister of Trade (1988–1993), Governor of the Bank Indonesia (1983–1988).
Jānis Šmits, 51, Latvian politician and Lutheran pastor.
James Spilker, 86, American electrical engineer.
Gordon C. Stauffer, 89, American college basketball coach (Washburn, Indiana State, Nicholls).
Asim Umar, Pakistani terrorist, leader of Al-Qaeda in the Indian Subcontinent, air strike.
Curt Wittlin, 78, Swiss philologist.
Robert Zelnick, 79, American journalist (ABC News).

24
Vurgun Ayyub, 61, Azerbaijani scientist.
Luz Bulnes, 92, Chilean magistrate and academic, member of the Constitutional Court (1989–2002).
Mordicai Gerstein, 83, American illustrator (Something Queer Is Going On), film director (The Berenstain Bears' Christmas Tree) and writer (The Man Who Walked Between the Towers).
Abdellah Kadiri, 82, Moroccan politician and military officer, co-founder of the National Democratic Party.
Magnar Lussand, 74, Norwegian politician, County Mayor of Hordaland (1991–1999).
Jimmy Nelson, 90, American ventriloquist (Farfel the Dog), complications from a stroke.
Luisito M. Reyes, 89, Filipino politician, Governor of Marinduque (1988-1995).
Alfonso de Salas, 76, Spanish journalist, co-founder of El Mundo.
Sana Solh, 80, Lebanese human rights activist.
Donald L. Tucker, 84, American politician, member (1966–1978) and Speaker of the Florida House of Representatives (1975–1978).
Roger H. Zion, 98, American politician, member of the U.S. House of Representatives from Indiana (1967–1975).

25
Paul Badura-Skoda, 91, Austrian pianist.
Michael D. Coe, 90, American archaeologist and anthropologist.
Jesper Hoffmeyer, 77, Danish biologist, heart attack.
Liakat Ali Khan, 64, Indian politician, MLA (1991–1996) and (2006–2011).
Venu Madhav, 39, Indian comedian and actor (Master, Tholi Prema, Hungama), kidney disease.
John McAdorey, 45, Irish Olympic sprinter (2000), melanoma.
Donald Nicholls, Baron Nicholls of Birkenhead, 86, British jurist, Lord of Appeal in Ordinary (1994–2007).
Hitoshi Nozaki, 97, Japanese chemist, co-discoverer of Nozaki–Hiyama–Kishi reaction.
Linda Porter, 86, American actress (Superstore, Dude, Where's My Car?, Twin Peaks), cancer.
Raymond Roberts, 88, Welsh Anglican priest and Royal Navy chaplain, Chaplain of the Fleet (1980–1984).
Libi Staiger, 91, American actress (The Most Happy Fella).
Arne Weise, 89, Swedish journalist and television personality (Sveriges Television).
Sir John Wilsey, 80, British general, Commander-in-Chief, Land Forces (1993–1996).
Richard Wyands, 91, American jazz pianist.

26
Lawrence J. Barkwell, 76, Canadian historian.
Giovanni Bramucci, 72, Italian road cyclist, Olympic bronze medallist (1968).
Plato Cacheris, 90, American defense lawyer, pneumonia.
Jacques Chirac, 86, French politician, President of France and Co-Prince of Andorra (1995–2007), Prime Minister (1974–1976, 1986–1988) and Mayor of Paris (1977–1995).
Mac Conner, 105, American commercial illustrator.
Peter Downsborough, 76, English footballer (Halifax Town, Swindon Town, Bradford City).
David Sidney Feingold, 96, American biochemist.
King Billy Cokebottle, 70, Australian comedian.
William Levada, 83, American Roman Catholic cardinal, Archbishop of Portland (1986–1995) and San Francisco (1995–2005).
Dan Lovén, 58, Swedish Olympic sailor (1984).
Gennady Manakov, 69, Russian cosmonaut (Soyuz TM-10, Soyuz TM-16).
Imre Molnár, 70, Hungarian Olympic gymnast (1972, 1976).
Nick Polano, 78, Canadian ice hockey player (Philadelphia Blazers) and coach (Detroit Red Wings).
Ronald L. Schlicher, 63, American diplomat, Ambassador to Lebanon (1994–1996) and Cyprus (2005–2008).
Irene Shubik, 89, British television producer.
Sun Dafa, 73, Chinese general, Political Commissar of the PLA General Logistics Department (2005–2010).
Kåre Tønnesson, 93, Norwegian historian.
Vukašin Višnjevac, 80, Bosnian football manager (Sarajevo, Vardar, Leotar).
Martin Wesley-Smith, 74, Australian composer, cancer.

27
Rudy Behlmer, 92, American film historian and writer.
Dante Bernini, 97, Italian Roman Catholic prelate, Bishop of Velletri-Segni (1981–1982) and Albano (1982–1999).
Abu Solaiman Chowdhury, 69, Bangladeshi civil servant.
Jack Edwards, 91, American politician, member of the U.S. House of Representatives (1965–1985), pancreatic cancer.
Rob Garrison, 59, American actor (The Karate Kid, Iron Eagle, Prom Night), organ failure.
Larry Hale, 77, Canadian ice hockey player.
Barrie Karp, 72, American artist and academic.
Rana Afzal Khan, 70, Pakistani military officer and politician, Minister of Finance, Revenue and Economic Affairs (2017–2018) and MP (2013–2018), heart disease.
John Francis Kinney, 82, American Roman Catholic prelate, Bishop of Bismarck (1982–1995) and Saint Cloud (1995–2013).
Jack Lasenby, 88, New Zealand children's author.
Gene Melchiorre, 92, American basketball player (Bradley Braves).
Mohammed Manga, 42, Senegalese-born Nigerian footballer.
Kiyoshi Nagai, 70, Japanese structural biologist, liver cancer.
Guillermo Perry, 73, Colombian economist and politician, Minister of Finance and Public Credit (1994–1996) and of Mines and Energy (1986–1988).
Russell Robins, 87, Welsh rugby union player (Pontypridd, national team).
Balireddy Satya Rao, 81, Indian politician, minister (1992–1994), MLA (1989–1994) and (1999-2004), traffic collision.
Inder Singh, 86, American human rights activist, founder of GOPIO.
Jan Schmidt, 85, Czech film director (The Lanfier Colony).
John J. Snyder, 93, American Roman Catholic prelate, Bishop of St. Augustine (1979–2000), namesake of Bishop John J. Snyder High School.
Jimmy Spicer, 61, American rapper, brain and lung cancer.
József Szekó, 64, Hungarian politician, MP (2010–2014).
Inés Talamantez, American ethnographer.
Joseph C. Wilson, 69, American writer (The Politics of Truth) and diplomat, Ambassador to Gabon (1992–1995), organ failure.
Ian Robert Young, 87, British medical physicist.

28
Peter Adam, 90, German-born British filmmaker and author.
José Aldunate, 102, Chilean Roman Catholic theologian and human rights activist.
Suad Beširević, 56, Slovenian football player (Borac Banja Luka, Apollon Limassol) and manager (Olimpija Ljubljana).
M. Chandran, 77, Malaysian Olympic football player (1972), (Selangor, national team) and manager.
Franco Cuter, 79, Italian-born Brazilian Roman Catholic prelate, Bishop of Grajaú (1998–2016).
Alexander Davion, 90, French-born British actor (Gideon's Way).
John Haylett, 74, British journalist, editor of the Morning Star (1995–2009).
Ismail Petra of Kelantan, 69, Malaysian royal, Sultan of Kelantan (1979–2010).
José José, 71, Mexican singer ("El Triste", "Como Tú") and actor (Gavilán o Paloma), pancreatic cancer.
Jan Kobuszewski, 85, Polish actor (Kwiecień, Alternatywy 4).
Nicolás Nogueras, 84, Puerto Rican politician, Senator (1973–1985, 1988–1996), heart disease.
Dessie O'Halloran, 79, Irish fiddler and vocalist.
Graciela Palau de Nemes, 100, Cuban literary critic.
Baikunth Lal Sharma, 89, Indian politician, MP (1991–2009).
Bill Ridley, 91, American college basketball player (Illinois).
Hogan Sheffer, 61, American television writer (The Young and the Restless, As the World Turns, Days of Our Lives).
Gérard Tremblay, 100, Canadian Roman Catholic prelate, Auxiliary Bishop of Montréal (1981–1991).
Vitaly Voloshinov, 72, Russian physicist.
Mark Zakharov, 85, Russian theater and film director (The Twelve Chairs, An Ordinary Miracle, To Kill a Dragon), pneumonia.

29
Beatriz Aguirre, 94, Mexican actress (The Tiger of Jalisco, Flight 971, My Mother Is Guilty).
Luz Amorocho, 97, Colombian architect.
Martin Bernheimer, 83, American music critic, Pulitzer Prize winner (1982), sarcoma.
busbee, 43, American songwriter ("Try", "Our Kind of Love", "Summer Nights") and music producer, glioblastoma.
John D'Arcy, 84, Australian football player (Richmond).
Patsy Elsener, 89, American diver, Olympic silver medallist (1948).
Jiang Weipu, 93, Chinese lianhuanhua artist, publisher, and historian.
Paavo Korhonen, 91, Finnish Olympic Nordic skier (1952, 1956, 1960), world champion (1958).
Ilkka Laitinen, 57, Finnish military officer, Chief of the Border Guard (2018–2019) and Executive Director of Frontex (2005–2014).
Yuriy Meshkov, 73, Russian politician, Prime Minister (1994) and President of Crimea (1994–1995).
Bobby Mitchell, 75, American baseball player (New York Yankees, Milwaukee Brewers).
Nguyễn Hữu Hạnh, 93, Vietnamese military officer (Army of the Republic of Vietnam).
Glen Smith, 90, American college basketball player (Utah).
Neil D. Van Sickle, 104, American Air Force major general.
Larry Willis, 78, American jazz pianist, complications from diabetes.
Michael de Zoysa, 73, Sri Lankan cricket administrator.

30
Sir David Akers-Jones, 92, British colonial official, Chief Secretary (1985–1987) and acting Governor of Hong Kong (1986–1987), colon cancer.
Tom Allsop, 90, Australian footballer (Hawthorn).
Victoria Braithwaite, 52, British biologist, pancreatic cancer. 
Marshall Efron, 81, American actor (The Transformers, THX 1138, Bang the Drum Slowly), cardiac arrest.
Wayne Fitzgerald, 89, American film (Bonnie and Clyde, The Godfather Part II) and television (The Bronx Zoo) title designer, Emmy winner (1987).
Shinya Inoué, 98, Japanese-born American scientist.
Viju Khote, 77, Indian actor (Sholay, Andaz Apna Apna, Zabaan Sambhalke), multiple organ failure.
Gianni Lenoci, 56, Italian jazz pianist.
Sharon Malcolm, 72, American politician, member of the West Virginia House of Delegates (since 2018).
Enrico Masseroni, 80, Italian Roman Catholic prelate, Bishop of Mondovi (1987–1996) and Archbishop of Vercelli (1996–2014).
Richard Mattessich, 97, Austrian-born Canadian business economist.
Kornel Morawiecki, 78, Polish politician and theoretical physicist, Senior Marshal of the Sejm (since 2015) and Chairman of Freedom and Solidarity (since 2016), pancreatic cancer.
Jessye Norman, 74, American opera singer, Grammy winner (1984, 1988, 1989, 1998), Grammy Lifetime Achievement Award (2006), multiple organ failure.
Ben Pon, 82, Dutch racing driver, Olympic sports shooter (1972) and businessman.
Louie Rankin, 66, Jamaican-born Canadian dancehall reggae artist and actor (Belly, Shottas''), traffic collision.
Ed Simonini, 65, American football player (Baltimore Colts, New Orleans Saints), cancer.
Pete Turnham, 99, American politician, member of the Alabama House of Representatives (1958–1998).

References

2019-09
 09